Anders August Rajala (30 June 1891 – 7 March 1957) was a Finnish wrestler. He competed at the 1912 Summer Olympics and the 1920 Summer Olympics.

References

External links
 

1891 births
1957 deaths
Sportspeople from Tampere
People from Häme Province (Grand Duchy of Finland)
Olympic wrestlers of Finland
Wrestlers at the 1912 Summer Olympics
Wrestlers at the 1920 Summer Olympics
Finnish male sport wrestlers